Ivan Sazdov (born 10 December 1983) is a Macedonian professional basketball guard.

External links
 Eurobasket Profile
 Proballers Profile
 FIBA Profile

References

1983 births
Macedonian men's basketball players
Living people
Guards (basketball)